Senator McLin may refer to:

Benjamin E. McLin (1851–1912), Florida State Senate
Rhine McLin (born 1948), Ohio State Senate

See also
Senator McLean (disambiguation)